The Namazgâh or Namazgjah was an open air prayer terrace in Elbasan, Albania. It became a Cultural Monument of Albania in 1980. But nowadays, its place was transformed into a bus station. The Namazgâh is shown on postcards as well as during prayers in Ramadan and Eid al-Fitr on posters.

The name Namazgâh is from Persian نمازگاه and means 'Place of Prayer'.

References

Cultural Monuments of Albania
Buildings and structures in Elbasan